Victoria Grist Windmill is an historic gristmill in Memorial Square in Victoria, Texas, United States. The windmill was added to the National Register of Historic Places on April 30, 1976, and became an American Society of Mechanical Engineers Landmark in May 1991.

The windmill was built in 1870 and is probably the last remaining windmill of European design in the Southwestern United States. Standing 35 feet high and supporting four 15-foot blades, the Dutch turret-mill style windmill was constructed by German immigrant Fred Meiss, Jr. and Otto Fiek near Spring Creek. The turret-style allowed the top to be turned so the sails face the wind. The millstones were made in Germany, and Rudolph Witte brought them through the port of Indianola in the 1840s. The stones were capable of grinding 500 pounds of cornmeal a week. The walls of the mill are constructed of wooden logs and covered with shakes. In 1935, the Victoria Grist Windmill was moved from its earlier location (west of Victoria) to Memorial Square.

See also

National Register of Historic Places listings in Victoria County, Texas
Recorded Texas Historic Landmarks in Victoria County

References

Buildings and structures in Victoria, Texas
Industrial buildings completed in 1870
Smock mills in the United States
Agricultural buildings and structures on the National Register of Historic Places in Texas
Grinding mills in Texas
German-American culture in Texas
Octagonal buildings in the United States
Windmills in Texas
National Register of Historic Places in Victoria, Texas
Recorded Texas Historic Landmarks
Grinding mills on the National Register of Historic Places
1870 establishments in Texas
Windmills on the National Register of Historic Places